Edward M. Layton (October 10, 1925 – December 26, 2004) was an American stadium organist who played at old Yankee Stadium for nearly 40 years, earning him membership in the New York Sports Hall of Fame.

Early life
Layton was a native of Philadelphia, Pennsylvania. He graduated from the West Chester State Teachers College (Now West Chester University) majoring in meteorology with a minor in music. He began playing the organ when he was 12 years old. While serving in the United States Navy during World War II, he learned to play the Hammond organ. After the war, he began a career as a professional organist writing scores for soap operas on CBS. Four noted CBS soap operas were "The Secret Storm," "Love is a Many Splendored Thing," "Love of Life," and "Where the Heart Is." During that time, he recorded nearly 27 albums of organ music. He was also noted for traveling the world as a spokesperson and artist for the Hammond Organ company.

New York Yankees
Layton joined the New York Yankees franchise in 1967 when CBS purchased the Yankees from Dan Topping. Because of pressure from the success of the New York Mets, their new Shea Stadium facility and the popularity of their organist, Jane Jarvis, Topping had installed an organ in Yankee Stadium at the beginning of the 1965 season. Lowrey organ demonstrator Toby Wright was the first Yankee organist and did the 1965 and 1966 seasons. Team president E. Michael Burke brought Layton in to play organ music at the stadium in 1967. At the time, he had never been to the stadium and knew nothing about baseball. He went on to play the organ for the Yankees for over three decades, taking a break from 1971 to 1977 to pursue other musical commitments. (Wright had returned as organist during that time.) When he retired on September 28, 2003, he played a final performance of "Take Me Out to the Ball Game", while fans chanted "Eddie! Eddie!".
Current New York Yankees organists Ed Alstrom and Paul Cartier were recruited by Layton to take his place at Yankee Stadium.

Other Work
In addition to playing for the Yankees, Layton was the organist for the New York Knicks and the New York Rangers from 1967 to 1985. He also played for several seasons of New York Islanders games in the 1990s and served one stint as organist for the indoor New York Cosmos soccer team at Madison Square Garden.

Layton also performed concerts in more than 200 cities for the Hammond Organ Company and released 27 albums. In addition, Layton played the organ at Radio City Music Hall for thirty years of Pace University commencements held there. The student union at Pace University's New York City campus was named in his honor.

Hobbies
Layton loved sailing and owned his own tugboat. He also owned a huge collection of model trains he maintained at his Forest Hills, New York home.  Eddie loved demonstrating organs to the public, and giving organ lessons.  In 2009, Soapluvva established a YouTube tribute channel to both Eddie Layton and Charles Paul, who were colleagues of each other at the CBS Broadcast Center in Manhattan.

Death
On December 26, 2004, Layton died of natural causes at his home in Forest Hills, New York at age 79, according to various reports following a brief illness. He was buried at Mount Hebron Cemetery in Queens, New York City, with his feet pointed away from Shea Stadium.

Controversy
Layton claimed credit as the first to come up with the idea of playing charge calls at a baseball game in 1971. However, Michael Silverbush claims to have made the innovation eight years prior.

Ken Burns' 1994 documentary Baseball contained some videographic evidence buttressing Silverbush's claim. During the sequence on the new New York Mets fans in the film's 8th installment, Silverbush can briefly be seen playing a trumpet at the Shea Stadium in 1969.

References

1925 births
2004 deaths
20th-century American keyboardists
United States Navy personnel of World War II
New York Yankees personnel
Musicians from Philadelphia
Stadium organists
American male organists
20th-century American musicians
20th-century organists
20th-century American male musicians
Burials at Mount Hebron Cemetery (New York City)